Popo may refer to:

Entertainment
 Popo (album), a 1951 jazz album by Shorty Rogers and Art Pepper
 Mr. Popo, a character in the manga and anime series Dragon Ball
 Popo, a character in the Japanese anime series Kaiba
 Popo, a player-controlled character in the Nintendo video game Ice Climber

People

Given name or surname
 Popo Molefe (born 1952), South African politician
 Hira Te Popo (died 1889), New Zealand tribal leader
 Sundar Popo (1943-2000), Trinidad and Tobago musician
 Tosan Popo (born 1992), English footballer

Nickname
 Popó (footballer, born 1978), Brazilian footballer
 Popo (footballer, born 1988), Spanish footballer
 Popó (footballer, born 1998), Angolan footballer
 Paul Chiang, or Po-po Chiang, Taiwanese conductor, producer and chamber musician
 Acelino Freitas, or Popó (born 1975), Brazilian boxer
 Mario Alberto Peña (1980–2013, American drug lord
 Pauline Phillips (1918–2013), American advice columnist and radio show host
 Vinícius Popó (born 2001), Brazilian footballer

Other uses
 Popo FC, a football club in Pakistan
 Popocatépetl, an active volcano in Mexico, also called El Popo
 Gen language, spoken in Togo
 Phla language, spoken in Benin and Togo
 Po-po or popo, slang for a police officer
 Popo (Mexican beverage), an indigenous Mexican beverage, made with cocoa

See also
 Grand-Popo, a town and commune in the Mono Department of south-western Benin
 Izta-Popo Zoquiapan National Park,  on the border of the Mexican states of México and Puebla
 Little Popo, a town in southeastern Togo
 Te Popo, a settlement on the North Island of New Zealand
 Po Po, Burmese installation and performance artist born Hla Oo

Lists of people by nickname